Jacopo Sandron (born 1 May 1998) is an Italian Greco-Roman wrestler. He is a bronze medalist at the European Wrestling Championships.

Career 

At the 2018 European Wrestling Championships held in Kaspiysk, Russia, he won one of the bronze medals in the 60 kg event.

In 2019, he represented Italy at the European Games in the 60 kg event without winning a medal. He was eliminated in his first match by Dato Chkhartishvili of Georgia.

In March 2021, he competed at the European Qualification Tournament in Budapest, Hungary hoping to qualify for the 2020 Summer Olympics in Tokyo, Japan.

Major results

References

External links 
 

Living people
1998 births
Place of birth missing (living people)
Italian male sport wrestlers
European Games competitors for Italy
Wrestlers at the 2019 European Games
European Wrestling Championships medalists
21st-century Italian people